Neuenweg is a village and a former municipality in the district of Lörrach in Baden-Württemberg in Germany. Since 1 January 2009, it is part of the municipality Kleines Wiesental.

External links
  Information about and images

Lörrach (district)
Baden
Villages in Baden-Württemberg